The 1965–66 Toronto Maple Leafs season was Toronto's 49th season in the National Hockey League (NHL).

Offseason

Regular season

Final standings

Record vs. opponents

Schedule and results

Playoffs
For the fourth straight year,  Toronto met Montreal in the first round. The Canadiens were victorious over the Leafs in four straight games.

Player statistics

Regular season
Scoring

Goaltending

Playoffs

Scoring

Goaltending

Awards and records

Transactions
The Maple Leafs were involved in the following transactions during the 1965–66 season.

Trades

Intra-League Draft

Intra-League Draft

Reverse Draft

Waivers

Draft picks
The Maple Leafs opted not to participate in the 1965 NHL Amateur Draft, which was held on April 27, 1965, at the Queen Elizabeth Hotel in Montreal, Quebec.

Farm teams

See also
 1965–66 NHL season

References

External links

Toronto Maple Leafs season, 1965-66
Toronto Maple Leafs seasons
Tor